Parmeshwar Kumar Agarwalla was an Indian politician and coal industrialist. He was a Member of Parliament, representing Bihar in the Rajya Sabha the upper house of India's Parliament as a member of the Bhartiya Janata Party. He was re-elected to Rajya Sabha from Bihar in 1998 but in 2000, he shifted to Jharkhand post division of Bihar.

References

Rajya Sabha members from Bihar
Rajya Sabha members from Jharkhand
Bharatiya Janata Party politicians from Jharkhand
1937 births
Businesspeople from Jharkhand
Living people
Rajya Sabha members from the Bharatiya Janata Party